Coleophora anatipennella is a moth of the case-bearer family (Coleophoridae).

Taxonomy
It was described by Jacob Hübner in 1796. It is the type species of its genus (Coleophora) and, via that, of its family.

It is not completely understood to what moth Johann August Ephraim Goeze's 1783 description of the supposedly distinct C. bernoulliella refers to, but it is presumed to be the same species as C. anatipennella.

Description

Head white. Antennae white, ringed with pale brownish. Basal joint with rather long tuft. Forewings white, posteriorly sprinkled with brownish. Costal cilia without dark line. Hindwings rather dark grey.

Range and ecology
C. anatipennella is found in Europe eastwards to the Ural Mountains; southeastwards its range extends across Asia Minor to Iran. It has also been recorded from Japan.

The caterpillars feed mainly on the leaves of Rosaceae and Fagales trees, as well as some others. Recorded host plants are:
 eurosids I: Rosales: Rosaceae
 Crataegus (hawthorns)
 Malus domestica (apple), and possibly other Malus
 Prunus (cherries, plums and peaches), including wild cherry (Prunus avium), blackthorn (Prunus spinosa), and possibly others
 Pyrus communis (European pear)
 Sorbus aucuparia (European rowan), and possibly other Sorbus
 eurosids I: Fagales: Betulaceae
 Alnus (alders)
 Betula (birches)
 Carpinus betulus (European hornbeam)
 Corylus avellana (common hazel)
 eurosids I: Fagales: Fagaceae
 Castanea sativa (sweet chestnut)
 Quercus (oaks)
 eurosids I: Malpighiales: Salicaceae
 Salix (willows)
 eurosids II: Malvales: Malvaceae
 Tilia (limes)
 Basal asterids: Cornales: Cornaceae
 Cornus sanguinea (common dogwood)

Before hibernation the young larvae make tiny mines. After hibernation, they continue window feeding. The mouth angle is 70–80°.

References

External links

 Coleophora anatipennella at UKmoths

anatipennella
Moths described in 1796
Moths of Asia
Moths of Europe
Taxa named by Jacob Hübner